Stigmella aromella is a moth of the family Nepticulidae which is endemic to Ontario, Canada.

Late instar larvae have been found in mid-August and mid-September, with adults on wing in February, March and late August. There are probably two generations per year.

The larvae feed on Populus species, including Populus deltoides and Populus x canadensis. They mine the leaves of their host plant.

External links
A taxonomic revision of the North American species of Stigmella (Lepidoptera: Nepticulidae)

Nepticulidae
Moths described in 1979
Endemic fauna of Ontario
Moths of North America